The  is a rapid transit system in Kobe, Hyōgo Prefecture, Japan. Like other large Japanese cities, Kobe's subway system is heavily complemented by suburban rail. In addition, two people mover lines also serve the Kobe area: the Port Island Line and the Rokko Island Line.

History
Construction of the first line of the subway system, the Seishin Line, began on November 25, 1971. On June 18, 1985, the Yamate Line was extended to Shin-Kobe and the Seishin Line was extended to Gakuen-toshi. When the final stage of the Seishin Line, an extension to Seishin-Chuo, opened on March 18, 1987, the Seishin Line and the Yamate Line were merged into the Seishin-Yamate Line.

The Hokushin Kyūkō Electric Railway opened the  Hokushin Line extension between Shin-Kobe and Tanigami on April 2, 1988; services on the Hokushin Line have through service onto the Seishin-Yamate Line.

On January 17, 1995, the Seishin-Yamate Line was damaged in the Great Hanshin earthquake. The day after the earthquake, limited services resumed between Seishin-Chuo and Itayado; full service was restored to the entire line in March 1995 after repairs were completed.

On June 1, 2020, Hokushin Line was transferred to Kobe Municipal Subway.

Lines

Network map

See also
 List of metro systems

Notes

References

External links 

  
Kobe at UrbanRail.net
Kobe at Subways.net
real-distance map of the Kobe subway network
Kobe subway network
Kobe Municipal Subway Map

 
Transport in Kobe